Wat Kudi Dao was a Buddhist temple in Ayutthaya, Thailand. It was restored by King Thai Sa in 1711. According to documents the temple was the residence of Phra Then Muni, an important priest who advised Crown Prince Boromakot during his residence there, and was later involved in various negotiations about the succession.

The temple is considered a good example of late Ayutthaya style. Abandoned after Ayutthaya fell to the Burmese in 1767, the site has been partially restored in modern times.

Important buildings in the complex include:

 The Ubosot (ordination hall) is 15.4 meters wide and 27.8 meters long. Its main entrance faces east. It has three gates at the front and two gates at the back.

 The Viharn (image hall) is 14 meters wide and 27 meters long. It has two gates at the front and two gates at the back.

 The bell-shaped, Sri Lankan style, principal chedi (stupa) is surrounded by eight smaller stupas.

 The Chedi, Viharn, and Ubosot are located inside a low enclosure wall.

 A building outside of the wall, called the Tumnak Kummalaen, might have served as the residence of Crown Prince (later King) Boromakot during the reign of King Thai Sa.

References 

Buddhist temples in Phra Nakhon Si Ayutthaya Province